Sikhrauli is a village in the south-western part of Mukundapur Village Development Committee in Nawalparasi district of Nepal. It covers the wards 8 and 9 of Mukundapur. The place is known for the famous temple 'Kailash Ashram' located on the bank of Narayani River.

References

Populated places in Nawalpur District